Magnavox Theatre is an American television anthology of comedies and dramas that aired seven hour-long episodes on CBS in 1950, alternating weekly with Ford Theatre. All were live except episode six (The Three Musketeers), which according to CBS, was the first hour-long film made in Hollywood for television. The film was made by Hal Roach Studios Inc., which also made "The Battle of Pilgrim Hill", which was scheduled to be broadcast on December 8, 1950.

Like its alternate-week counterpart, Magnavox Theatre offered the promise of adaptations of classic literature, novels, and short stories in addition to original dramas. The program was produced by Garth Montgomery. The series was directed by Budd Boetticher and Richard L. Bare.  Among its guest stars were Kim Stanley, Robert Clarke, Leslie Nielsen, Marjorie Lord, Dane Clark, Cecil Kellaway, and Edward Everett Horton. 

A review in The New York Times cited much negative and little positive about the program's second episode, "In the Fog". It ended with an overall opinion of the first two episodes: "A show of this type is supposed to have a little 'oomph.' All that can be said so far is 'humph.'"

Partial list of episodes

References

External links

1950s American anthology television series
1950 American television series debuts
1950 American television series endings
CBS original programming
American live television series
Black-and-white American television shows